The De Luxe was an American automobile manufactured in 1907 by the De Luxe Motor Car Company of Detroit, Michigan Country Life in America, February 1907, p. 456)]. The De Luxe was a high-priced vehicle for its day, retailing for around $5000. De Luxe took over the factory belonging to the Kirk Manufacturing Company, maker of the Yale automobile in Toledo, Ohio, in 1906. Soon after De Luxe moved to a brand new facility on a  site on Clark Street at Jefferson Avenue in Detroit. After producing fewer than 100 cars in 1908, the company was acquired by the E-M-F Company in 1909. The factory was used by E-M-F to build the Flanders 20. E-M-F was acquired by Studebaker in 1910, who continued to produce automobiles in Detroit until its operations were moved to South Bend, Indiana, in the 1920s.

See also
 Pontiac marketed cars under the name "De-Lux"
 Deluxe
 List of defunct automobile manufacturers of the United States

References

Notes

Bibliography
Bonsall, Thomas E., More Than They Promised: The Studebaker Story

External links
 StudebakerHistory.com - Detroit Plants

Defunct motor vehicle manufacturers of the United States
Motor vehicle manufacturers based in Michigan